The 480th Fighter Squadron (480th FS), nicknamed the "Warhawks", is an active United States Air Force unit operating the General Dynamics F-16CJ Fighting Falcon. The 480 FS assigned to the 52nd Fighter Wing, Spangdahlem Air Base, Germany is the only United States Air Forces in Europe – Air Forces Africa flying unit performing the Suppression of Enemy Air Defenses (SEAD) mission.

History

World War II
The squadron was first activated by III Bomber Command as the 480th Bombardment Squadron (Medium) on 15 July 1942 flying the B-26 Marauder, assigned to the 336th Bombardment Group. It was inactivated on 1 May 1944 while based at Lake Charles Army Air Field.

Tactical Air Command (1957–1959)
The unit was reactivated as the 480th Fighter-Bomber Squadron (480th FBS) on 25 September 1957 at England Air Force Base, Louisiana, as part of the 366th Fighter-Bomber Wing. During this time it was equipped with the North American F-100D/F Super Sabre and Republic F-84 Thunderjet. On 1 July 1958, the unit was redesignated the 480th Tactical Fighter Squadron (480th TFS). On 1 April 1959, it was inactivated again due to budgetary reductions.

United States Air Force Europe (1962–1963)
Three years later on 30 April 1962, the 480th TFS was reactivated again under United States Air Forces in Europe (USAFE) and assigned to the 366th Tactical Fighter Wing. Arriving at Chaumont-Semoutiers Air Base, France, with the Republic F-84F Thunderstreak on 8 May. The squadron relocated to Phalsbourg-Bourscheid Air Base on 21 December 1962, where they remained until 1963 when the squadron was withdrawn from France upon request of French government, due to disagreements over the basing of nuclear-weapon capable F-100 Super Sabres on French soil. While based in France, the 480th TFS underwent deployments to Wheelus Air Base in Libya as well as participating in USAFE exercises.

Vietnam War

In July 1963, the 480th TFS was reassigned to Holloman Air Force Base, New Mexico, where it re-equipped with the McDonnell Douglas F-4C Phantom II in 1965. The squadron was deployed to Da Nang Air Base, South Vietnam, on 5 February 1966 as part of the USAF buildup in Southeast Asia. From here, the Warhawks carried out operations over North Vietnam, South Vietnam and Laos. The 480th TFS were the first squadron to shoot down a Mikoyan-Gurevich MiG-21 during the Vietnam War. While at Da Nang Air Base, the squadron scored nine MiG kills.

In November 1967, a member of the 480th Tactical Fighter Squadron, Capt. Lance Sijan, ejected from his disabled aircraft and was badly injured in North Vietnam. Despite his injuries, he evaded enemy forces for more than 40 days and then, when captured, managed to escape briefly. Captain Sijan later died in a prison camp and was posthumously awarded the Medal of Honor.

The 480th TFS converted to the F-4D by May 1968. On 15 April 1969, the squadron moved to Phù Cát Air Base (tail code: HK), South Vietnam. The continued drawdown of United States forces from Vietnam resulted in the inactivation of 37th TFW at Phù Cát AB on 31 March 1970. The wing assets remained and were re-designated as the 12th Tactical Fighter Wing when the 12th TFW was moved without personnel or equipment from Cam Ranh Bay Air Base on 1 April 1970, to replace the 37th Tactical Fighter Wing and its units.

On 20 October 1971, the 480th TFS flew its last combat mission, which was also the last combat sortie for 12th TFW. 480 TFS F-4Ds were originally scheduled for redeployment to Holloman AFB, however, instead were distributed to bases throughout Southeast Asia: Clark Air Base, Philippines; Ubon Royal Thai Air Force Base and Udon AB, Thailand; Da Nang AB; and Inspection and Repair as Necessary facilities (IRAN) at Ching Chuan Kang Air Base Taiwan. The 480 TFS was therefore inactivated on 17 November 1971.

United States Air Force Europe (1976–1994)

The 480th TFS was reactivated on 15 November 1976 as part of the 52nd Tactical Fighter Wing at Spangdahlem Air Base, West Germany, flying the F-4D Phantom II. In 1979, the Warhawks converted to the F-4E Phantom II.

In late 1983, the 480th TFS, along with the entire 52nd TFW, was tasked with the Wild Weasel mission, being equipped with eight F-4G Advanced Wild Weasels and 16 F-4E Phantom IIs.

On 19 September 1985, the history of the 480th Bombardment Squadron and 480th Air Resupply Squadron was consolidated with the existing 480th Tactical Fighter Squadron which had first formed in 1957.

In April 1987, the 480th began receiving the General Dynamics F-16C Fighting Falcon, initially operating it in tandem with the F-4G.

In late 1990, the 480th TFS deployed to the Middle East in support of Operation Desert Shield before flying SEAD missions between 17 January and 11 April 1991 as part of Operation Desert Storm. Post-Desert Storm, the squadron's F-4Gs were transferred over to the 81st Tactical Fighter Squadron leaving the 480th as a sole F-16 unit. In October 1991, the squadron was redesignated as the 480th Fighter Squadron.

In 1993, the Warhawks became the USAF's first squadron to be equipped with the Block 50 F-16s, and was again tasked with the Suppression of Enemy Air Defenses (SEAD).

On 1 April 1994, the squadron was inactivated again as part of the post-Cold War force reductions, being replaced by the 22nd Fighter Squadron who had relocated to Spangdahlem from Bitburg Air Base on the same day.

Modern Era (2010–present)

Spangdahlem Air Base
In April 2010, the 52nd Fighter Wing's strength was reduced by one third when 20 F-16CJs and one F-16D were transferred to the 179th Fighter Squadron of the Air National Guard. As a result of the drawdown of F-16s, the 22nd and 23rd Fighter Squadrons were inactivated on 13 August 2010 and formed a single "new" squadron, the 480th Fighter Squadron. The reformed squadron retained the primary SEAD role of its previous incarnation. In October 2010, the newly reactivated 480th FS deployed for the first time to Graf Ignatievo Air Base in Bulgaria to carry out training with Mikoyan MiG-29s of the Bulgarian Air Force.

 
The 480th FS participated in Exercise Red Flag 11-2 at Nellis Air Force Base, Nevada, between 22 January and 4 February 2011. In March 2011, the Warhawks deployed to Aviano Air Base, Italy, as part of Operation Odyssey Dawn in order to create a no-fly zone over Libya. They flew their first sortie on 21 March 2011, tasked with SEAD. On 2 May 2011, the 480th Expeditionary Fighter Squadron deployed to Iraq as part of Operation New Dawn. Returning in November, the 480th FS were the last fighter unit to support Operation New Dawn. The squadron's F-16s flew 2,259 sorties with a total of 9,000 flying hours during its deployment to Iraq.

In March 2012, the 480th deployed to Konya Air Base to take part in Exercise Anatolian Eagle 2012 with the Turkish Air Force, practising SEAD. On 9 November 2012, the 52nd OG set up a detachment (52nd OG Det 1) at Łask Air Base in Poland.

In April 2013, the 480th EFS deployed to Kandahar Airfield, Afghanistan, for six months to support Operation Enduring Freedom. The pilots who did not deploy were effected by the 2013 United States budget sequestration which led to a loss of multiple flying currencies, these weren't regained until August 2013 when flying resumed.

On 30 May 2014, the 480th FS deployed in support of 52nd OG Det 1 at Łask for two weeks.

On 11 August 2015, F-16CJ 91-0366 crashed in Bavaria after suffering a structural failure which prohibited fuel flow to the engine. The pilot ejected safely.

 
On 7 April 2016, the 480th EFS deployed to Southwest Asia in support of Operation Inherent Resolve, returning to Spangdahlem on 12 October.

From 2 to 22 February 2019, the Warhawks deployed 18 F-16s to Monte Real Air Base, Portugal, to operate alongside local F-16 squadrons (Esquadra 201 and Esquadra 301) of the Portuguese Air Force. On 8 October 2019, F-16CJ 91-0340 crashed near Zemmer due to it suffering partial power loss while flying during bad weather, the pilot ejected with minor injuries. The 480th EFS deployed to Uvda Air Base in Israel between 3 and 14 November 2019 to participate in Exercise Blue Flag 2019.

Future
On 29 July 2020, it was announced by the Department of Defense that the 480th FS would be re-positioned from Spangdahlem to Aviano Air Base, Italy as part of a plan to withdraw forces from Germany. The plans to move 480th FS have been put on hold as the new Biden administration looks to review the previous administrations plans to move the squadron to Italy.

Lineage
 480th Bombardment Squadron
 Constituted as the 480th Bombardment Squadron (Medium) on 9 July 1942
 Activated on 15 July 1942
 Disbanded on 1 May 1944
 Reconstituted and consolidated with the 480th Air Resupply Squadron and the 480th Tactical Fighter Squadron as the 480th Tactical Fighter Squadron on 19 September 1985

 480th Air Resupply Squadron
 Constituted as the 580th Aerial Resupply Squadron on 15 March 1951
 Activated on 16 April 1951
 Redesignated 580th Air Resupply Squadron on 5 November 1951
 Inactivated on 18 October 1956
 Redesignated 480th Air Resupply Squadron on 31 July 1985
 Consolidated with the 480th Bombardment Squadron and the 480th Tactical Fighter Squadron as the 480th Tactical Fighter Squadron on 19 September 1985

 480th Fighter Squadron
 Constituted as the 480th Fighter-Bomber Squadron on 1 September 1957
 Activated on 25 September 1957
 Redesignated 480th Tactical Fighter Squadron on 1 July 1958
 Inactivated on 1 April 1959
 Activated on 30 April 1962 (not organized)
 Organized on 8 May 1962
 Inactivated on 17 November 1971
 Activated on 15 November 1976
 Consolidated with the 480th Air Resupply Squadron and the 480th Bombardment Squadron on 19 September 1985
 Redesignated 480th Fighter Squadron on 1 October 1991
 Inactivated on 1 April 1994
 Activated on 13 August 2010

Assignments
 336th Bombardment Group, 15 July 1942 – 1 May 1944
 580th Air Resupply and Communications Group (later 580th Air Resupply Group), 16 April 1951 – 18 October 1956
 366th Fighter Bomber Wing (later 366th Tactical Fighter) Wing, 25 September 1957 – 1 April 1959 (not operational after 4 March 1959)
 United States Air Forces Europe, 30 April 1962
 366th Tactical Fighter Wing, 8 May 1962
 2d Air Division, 5 February 1966 (attached to 6252d Tactical Fighter Wing)
 Seventh Air Force, 1 April 1966 (attached to 6252d Tactical Fighter Wing to 7 April 1966, then to 35th Tactical Fighter Wing)
 35th Tactical Fighter Wing, 23 June 1966
 366th Tactical Fighter Wing, 10 October 1966
 37th Tactical Fighter Wing, 15 April 1969
 12th Tactical Fighter Wing, 31 March 1970 – 17 November 1971
 52d Tactical Fighter Wing (later 52d Fighter Wing), 15 November 1976
 52d Operations Group, 31 March 1992 – 1 April 1994
 52d Operations Group, 13 August 2010 – present

Stations
 MacDill Field, Florida, 15 July 1942
 Fort Myers Army Air Field, Florida, 10 August 1942
 Avon Park Army Air Field, Florida, 13 December 1942
 MacDill Field, Florida, 13 October 1943
 Lake Charles Army Air Field, Louisiana, 6 November 1943 – 1 May 1944
 Mountain Home Air Force Base, Idaho, 16 April 1951 – 19 September 1952
 Wheelus Field (later, Wheelus Air Base), Libya, 28 September 1952 – 18 October 1956
 Alexandria Air Force Base (later England Air Force Base), Louisiana, 25 September 1957
 Chaumont-Semoutiers Air Base, France, 8 May 1962
 Phalsbourg-Bourscheid Air Base, France, 21 December 1962
 Holloman Air Force Base, New Mexico, 12 July 1963
 Da Nang Air Base, South Vietnam, 5 February 1966
 Korat Air Base, Thailand, 21 May 1966 – 24 May 1966 (Detachment)
 Phù Cát Air Base, South Vietnam, 15 April 1969 – 17 November 1971
 Spangdahlem Air Base, Germany, 15 November 1976 – 1 April 1994
 Spangdahlem Air Base, Germany, 13 August 2010 – present

Aircraft

 Martin B-26 Marauder (1942–1944)
 Boeing B-29 Superfortress (1951–1956)
 Fairchild C-119 Flying Boxcar (1951–1956)
 Grumman SA-16 Albatross (1951–1956)
 North American F-100D/F Super Sabre (1957–1959)
 Republic F-84 Thunderjet (1958–1959)
 Republic F-84F Thunderstreak (1962–1965)
 McDonnell Douglas F-4C Phantom II (1965–1968)
 McDonnell Douglas F-4D Phantom II (1968–1971; 1976–1979)
 McDonnell Douglas F-4E Phantom II (1979–1987)
 McDonnell Douglas F-4G Wild Weasel V (1983–1991)
 General Dynamics F-16C/D Fighting Falcon  (1987–1994; 2010–present)

References

 Notes

Bibliography

 
 
 
 

Fighter squadrons of the United States Air Force